Muhammad Ali Siddiqui (7 March 1938 – 9 Jan 2013) was a noted scholar of Urdu literature, educationist, literary critic and a newspaper columnist from Pakistan. He was also widely known by his pen name Ariel in Pakistan.

Early life and career
He was born on 7 March 1938 in Amroha, India, and was brought up in Karachi, Pakistan. He died on 9 January 2013 at Karachi, Pakistan. His family had migrated to Pakistan in 1948. He received his early education at Christian Mission School in Karachi. Then he went on to receive his master's degree in English literature from the University of Karachi in 1962. He was able to use English, French, Hindko, Hindi Persian, Punjabi, Sindhi, Seraiki and Urdu languages. Muhammad Ali Siddiqui completed his D.Litt degree in Pakistan Studies in 2003 after doing his PhD in the same subject in 1992. He worked at the Pakistan Studies Center of the University of Karachi.

Muhammad Ali Siddiqui was a member of many national and international organizations such as: Pakistan Writers Guild, Pakistan, Association Des Litteraire Critiques International, Paris, European Union of Writers and Scientists, Rome, International Association of Literary Critics (AILC), Stavanger, Norway, Majlis-i-Farough-i-Urdu Adab, Doha, Qatar.

Ali Siddiqui was a prominent Urdu language critic. He was also the Dean of the Faculty of Management and Social Sciences, Institute of Business and Technology, Karachi. He also served as Dean, Faculty of Education & Social Sciences at Hamdard University, Karachi for six years. He taught at Karachi University for a number of years. He served as the Director of Quaid-i-Azam Academy for six years and was the President of Progressive Writers Association in 2013 at the time of his death.

Ali Siddiqui had penned more than 100 research articles. He has 16 books to his credit, two of them Tawazun and Croce ki Sarguzasht, were adjudged as the 'Best Books of the Years' in 1976 and 1979 respectively. He used to write for the business journal Business Recorder and he wrote a  column for the Dawn newspaper under the pen name Ariel for over two decades.

He had delivered lectures in many overseas universities such as the School of Oriental & American Studies London University, Carlton University, Canada, the University of Toronto, Canada, Oslo University, Norway.

His importance as a critic has been applauded by the critics of Urdu language like Majnun Gorakhpuri,  Akhtar Hussain Raipuri, Professor Mumtaz Husain, Professor Mujtaba Husain, Dr. Ali Jawwad Zaidi, Dr. Wazir Agha etc. Among the creative writers, Faiz Ahmed Faiz regarded him as the only creative critic from Pakistan, the others being Dr. Narang, Dr. Zoe Ansari & Dr. Qamar Rais from India.

Journalist Khalid Ahmed wrote:

Books
 Tawazun (A Book of Critical Writing) (1976)
 Croce Ki Sarguzasht (Translation of Bendetto Croce, Autotrigraphy) (1976)
 Nishanat (A Collection of Critical Writings) (1981)
 Pakistaniat(Vol.1), Edited with Dr. H.M.Jafri (1989)
 Mazameem (A Book of Critical Writings) (1991)
 Isharye (Collection of Critical Writings) (1994)
 Quaid-i-Azam: A Chronology (Urdu) – Published by Quaid-i-Azam Academy, Karachi
 Quaid-i-Azam: A Chronology (English) – Published by Quaid-i-Azam Academy, Karachi
 Quaid-i-Azam: Speeches (English) – Published by Quaid-i-Azam Academy, Karachi
 Quaid-i-Azam: Urdu Adibon Ki Nazar Mein (Urdu) – Published by Quaid-i-Azam Academy, Karachi
 Zikr-i-Quaid-i-Azam (Urdu) – Published by Quaid-i-Azam Academy, Karachi Talash-i-Iqbal (Urdu) (2002)
 Sir Syed Ahmed Khan Aur Jiddat Pasandi (Urdu) Karachi (2003)
 Sir Syed Ahmed Khan Aur Jiddat Pasandi (Urdu) 2nd Edition Karachi (2004)
 Mutalea-i-Josh Malihabadi (Urdu) Karachi (2005)
 Ghalib Aur Aaj Ka Shaoor – Idara-i-Yaadgar-i-Ghalib, Karachi (2005)
 Idrak (A Collection of Critical Writings), Karachi (2007)

Awards and recognition
 Pride of Performance Award by the President of Pakistan in 2003
 Canadian Association of South Asian Studies, 'scholar of the year' award in 1984

See also
 Quaid-i-Azam Academy

References

1938 births
2013 deaths
Islamic philosophers
Pakistani scholars
Muhajir people
Pakistani writers
Pakistani philosophers
People from Amroha
Pakistani literary critics
University of Karachi alumni
Academic staff of the University of Karachi
Academic staff of Hamdard University